Abha is the capital of Asir province in Saudi Arabia.

Abha may also refer to:

 Abha (football club), a Saudi Arabian football team
 Abha Dawesar (b. 1974), Indian novelist
 Abha (Bahá'í), Arabic for "Most Glorious." Is the superlative form of Bahá. It is also the name of Heaven in the Bahá'í Faith
Abha (tetragraph)